This article shows all participating team squads at the 2015 Women's European Volleyball Championship, held in the Netherlands and Belgium from 26 September to 4 October 2015.

Pool A

Head Coach: Marco Bonitta

Head Coach: Giovanni Guidetti

Head Coach: Jacek Nawrocki

Head Coach: Bruno Najdic

Pool B

Head Coach: Bülent Karslioglu

Head Coach: Gert Vande Broek

Head Coach: Jan José De Brandt

Head Coach: Ferhat Akbaş

Pool C

Head Coach: Dragan Nešić

Head Coach: Petr Khilko

Head Coach: Angelo Vercesi

Head Coach: Yuri Marichev

Pool D

Head Coach: Carlo Parisi

Head Coach: Luciano Pedulla

Head Coach: Guillermo Gallardo

Head coach: Zoran Terzić

References

E
Women's European Volleyball Championships
European Volleyball Championships